James Parrott (August 2, 1897 – May 10, 1939) was an American actor and film director; and the younger brother of film comedian Charley Chase.

Biography

Early years
James Gibbons Parrott was born in Baltimore, Maryland, to Charles and Blanche Thompson Parrott. In 1903, his father died from a heart attack, leaving the family in bad financial shape, which forced them to move in with a relative. Charley Jr. quit school, so he could go to work, in order to support his mother and brother. Eventually the call of the stage beckoned him, and Charley Jr. left home at age 16 to travel the vaudeville circuit as a singer and comedic performer. By the time James had reached his teens, he too, had quit school, and became involved with the street gangs of Baltimore.

Later, Charley's connections in the film industry helped his younger brother to become established in movies, and he would appear during the 1920s in a series of relatively successful comedies for producer Hal Roach. He was billed first as "Paul Parrott", then "Jimmie Parrott", Approximately 75 comedies were produced from 1921 to 1923, with titles continuing to be released through Pathé until 1926. Frequent co-stars included Marie Mosquini, Jobyna Ralston, Eddie Baker, and Sunshine Sammy.

Parrott is probably best known as a comedy director. As "James Parrott", he specialized in the two-reel misadventures of Laurel and Hardy, including the Oscar-winning classic The Music Box, and Helpmates.

Later years
During the 1930s Parrott had acquired serious drinking and drug problems (his diet medications were actually addictive amphetamines) and although still able to direct quality shorts, he had developed a reputation as unreliable. By the mid-1930s his work was spotty: Stan Laurel used him sporadically to contribute gags to the Laurel and Hardy features, and he would direct an Our Gang short in 1934, plus several acceptable entries in Thelma Todd–Patsy Kelly series.

Death
By 1937, Parrott was accepting any jobs that came his way. He could no longer be counted on to direct or write, and relied on his brother to support him financially. There was a brief marriage to Ruby Ellen McCoy in 1937, but as his various addictions worsened, so did his state of mind.

Parrott died at the age of 41 of heart failure. His brother Charley was devastated and died 13 months later. He is interred at Glendale's Forest Lawn Memorial Park, the same cemetery where his brother, Charley Chase rests.
His brother had refused to help him financially until he cleaned up his act. Parrott's death at 41 was attributed to a heart attack, but former Hal Roach associates maintained he committed suicide. Guilt-ridden over his brother's tragic end, Chase drank himself to death a year later.

Filmography

Actor 

 1918 : Hit Him Again
 1918 : A Gasoline Wedding
 1918 : Look Pleasant, Please
 1918 : Here Come the Girls
 1918 : Let's Go
 1918 : On the Jump
 1918 : Follow the Crowd
 1918 : Pipe the Whiskers
 1918 : It's a Wild Life
 1918 : Hey There!
 1918 : Kicked Out
 1918 : Two-Gun Gussie
 1918 : Fireman Save My Child
 1918 : Sic 'Em, Towser
 1918 : Somewhere in Turkey
 1918 : An Ozark Romance
 1918 : Kicking the Germ Out of Germany
 1918 : That's Him
 1918 : Bride and Gloom
 1918 : Two Scrambled
 1918 : No Place Like Jail
 1918 : Why Pick on Me?
 1918 : Just Rambling Along
 1918 : Hear 'Em Rave
 1918 : She Loves Me Not
 1919 : An Auto Nut
 1919 : Do You Love Your Wife?
 1919 : Wanted - $5,000
 1919 : Going! Going! Gone!
 1919 : Hustling for Health
 1919 : Hoots Mon!
 1919 : I'm on My Way
 1919 : The Dutiful Dub
 1919 : A Sammy in Siberia
 1919 : Young Mr. Jazz
 1919 : Crack Your Heels
 1919 : Ring Up the Curtain
 1919 : Si, Senor
 1919 : Pistols for Breakfast
 1919 : Swat the Crook
 1919 : Off the Trolley
 1919 : At the Old Stage Door
 1919 : A Jazzed Honeymoon
 1919 : Count Your Change
 1919 : Chop Suey & Co.
 1919 : Heap Big Chief
 1919 : Don't Shove
 1920 : His First Flat Tire
 1921 : Big Town Ideas
 1922 : Try, Try Again
 1922 : Paste and Paper
 1922 : Loose Change
 1922 : Rich Man, Poor Man
 1922 : Stand Pat
 1922 : Friday the Thirteenth
 1922 : The Late Lamented
 1922 : A Bed of Roses
 1922 : The Sleuth
 1922 : Busy Bees
 1922 : The Bride-to-Be
 1922 : Take Next Car
 1922 : Touch All the Bases
 1922 : The Truth Juggler
 1922 : Rough on Romeo
 1922 : Wet Weather
 1922 : The Landlubber
 1922 : Bone Dry
 1922 : Soak the Shiek
 1922 : Face the Camera
 1922 : The Uppercut
 1922 : Shiver and Shake
 1922 : The Golf Bug
 1922 : Shine 'Em Up!
 1922 : Washed Ashore
 1922 : Harvest Hands
 1922 : The Flivver
 1922 : Blaze Away
 1922 : I'll Take Vanilla
 1922 : Fair Week
 1922 : The White Blacksmith
 1922 : Fire the Fireman
 1923 : Post No Bills
 1923 : Watch Your Wife
 1923 : Mr. Hyppo
 1923 : Don't Say Die
 1923 : Jailed and Bailed
 1923 : A Loose Tightwad
 1923 : Tight Shoes
 1923 : Do Your Stuff
 1923 : Shoot Straight
 1923 : For Safe Keeping
 1923 : Bowled Over
 1923 : Get Your Man
 1923 : The Smile Wins
 1923 : Good Riddance
 1923 : Speed the Swede
 1923 : Sunny Spain
 1923 : For Art's Sake
 1923 : Fresh Eggs
 1923 : Uncovered Wagon
 1923 : For Guests Only
 1923 : Live Wires
 1923 : Take the Air
 1923 : Finger Prints
 1923 : Winner Take All
 1923 : Dear Ol' Pal
 1923 : Join the Circus
 1924 : Get Busy
 1925 : Whispering Lions
 1925 : The Caretaker's Daughter
 1925 : Are Parents Pickles?
 1925 : Whistling Lions
 1926 : Between Meals
 1926 : Don't Butt In
 1926 : Soft Pedal
 1926 : Pay the Cashier
 1926 : The Only Son
 1926 : Hired and Fired
 1926 : The Old War-Horse
 1931 : Pardon Us
 1934 : Washee Ironee

Director

 1921 : The Pickaninny
 1922 : Mixed Nuts
 1924 : Just a Minute
 1924 : Hard Knocks
 1924 : Love's Detour
 1924 : The Fraidy Cat
 1924 : Don't Forget
 1925 : Should Sailors Marry?
 1926 : The Cow's Kimona
 1926 : On the Front Page
 1926 : There Ain't No Santa Claus
 1927 : Many Scrappy Returns
 1927 : Are Brunettes Safe?
 1927 : A One Mama Man
 1927 : Forgotten Sweeties
 1927 : Bigger and Better Blondes
 1927 : Fluttering Hearts
 1927 : What Women Did for Me
 1927 : The Sting of Stings
 1927 : The Lighter That Failed
 1927 : Now I'll Tell One
 1927 : Us
 1927 : Assistant Wives
 1927 : Never the Dames Shall Meet
 1928 : All for Nothing
 1928 : Galloping Ghosts
 1928 : Their Purple Moment
 1928 : Should Married Men Go Home?
 1928 : Two Tars
 1928 : Habeas Corpus
 1928 : Chasing Husbands
 1929 : Ruby Lips
 1929 : Lesson No. 1
 1929 : Happy Birthday
 1929 : Furnace Trouble
 1929 : Stewed, Fried and Boiled
 1929 : Perfect Day
 1929 : They Go Boom!
 1929 : The Hoose-Gow
 1930 : La Vida nocturna
 1930 : Une nuit extravagante
 1930 : Tiembla y Titubea
 1930 : Der Spuk um Mitternacht
 1930 : Radiomanía
 1930 : Noche de duendes
 1930 : Feu mon oncle
 1930 : Night Owls
 1930 : Blotto
 1930 : Brats
 1930 : Below Zero
 1930 : Hog Wild
 1930 : The Laurel-Hardy Murder Case
 1930 : Another Fine Mess
 1931 : La Señorita de Chicago
 1931 : Los Presidiarios
 1931 : Be Big!
 1931 : The Pip from Pittsburgh
 1931 : Monerías
 1931 : Rough Seas
 1931 : One of the Smiths
 1931 : Pardon Us
 1931 : The Panic Is On
 1931 : Skip the Maloo!
 1931 : What a Bozo!
 1932 : Helpmates
 1932 : The Music Box
 1932 : The Chimp
 1932 : County Hospital
 1932 : Young Ironsides
 1932 : Girl Grief
 1932 : Now We'll Tell One
 1932 : Mr. Bride
 1933 : Twice Two
 1933 : Twin Screws
 1934 : Mixed Nuts
 1934 : A Duke for a Day
 1934 : Benny from Panama
 1934 : Washee Ironee
 1934 : Opened by Mistake
 1935 : Treasure Blues
 1935 : Sing, Sister, Sing
 1935 : The Tin Man
 1935 : The Misses Stooge
 1935 : Do Your Stuff

Writer

 1925 : Chasing the Chaser
 1925 : Unfriendly Enemies
 1925 : Laughing Ladies
 1926 : Your Husband's Past
 1926 : Wandering Papas
 1926 : Say It with Babies
 1926 : Never Too Old
 1926 : Along Came Auntie
 1926 : Should Husbands Pay?
 1926 : Wise Guys Prefer Brunettes
 1926 : Get 'Em Young
 1926 : On the Front Page
 1928 : Galloping Ghosts
 1928 : Should Married Men Go Home?
 1937 : Way Out West
 1938 : Swiss Miss
 1938 : Block-Heads

References

External links
 

James "Paul" Parrott: The Other Parrott Brother

Hal Roach Studios actors
Parrot, James
Vaudeville performers
1897 births
1939 deaths
Silent film comedians
Male actors from Baltimore
Film directors from Maryland
20th-century American male actors
Burials at Forest Lawn Memorial Park (Glendale)
American male film actors
American male comedy actors
20th-century American comedians
Comedians from California